Kearton is a hamlet in the Yorkshire Dales, North Yorkshire, England. Kearton is situated near Low Row and Reeth.

References

External links

Villages in North Yorkshire
Swaledale